Jan Lennartsson (born September 22, 1981) is a Swedish handball player. He started his professional career in 2000 playing for IK Sävehof, Gothenburg. After six seasons with the club, he was contracted by the Danish club AaB Håndbold in 2007. As of 2009, he has played 94 games with the Swedish national handball team. His merits include
 2004, winner of league and play-off, Elitserien (men's handball) with IK Sävehof
 2005, winner of league, Elitserien (men's handball) with IK Sävehof
 2005, Supercup champion with the Swedish national handball team
 2006, winner of play-off, Elitserien (men's handball) with IK Sävehof

Currently, Jan Lennartsson is a graduate student at the department of mathematical sciences, Gothenburg University, Sweden. His research focus is statistical analysis of weather measurements. He was awarded the Licentiate of Engineering degree in 2008.

Jan Lennartsson is married and father of three children.

References

Living people
Swedish male handball players
Chalmers University of Technology alumni
Swedish expatriate sportspeople in Denmark
1981 births